The Singapore Tennis Open was a new addition to the ATP Tour in 2021.

Sander Gillé and Joran Vliegen won the title, defeating Matthew Ebden and John-Patrick Smith in the final, 6–2, 6–3.

Seeds

Draw

Draw

References

 Main draw

Singapore Tennis Open - Doubles